Music to Gang Bang is the fifth studio album by American gangsta rap group Compton's Most Wanted (labeled as Compton's Most Wanted with MC Eiht). It was released on June 13, 2006 through B-Dub Records with distribution by Universal Music. Production was handled entirely by Mr. Criminal, except for one track produced by Fingazz. It features guest appearances from Mr. Criminal and Stomper (Soldier Ink). The album contained four singles: "Music to Gang Bang", "Still a Menace", "Come Ride with Me" and "We Get Down Like That".

Track listing

References

2006 albums
MC Eiht albums
Compton's Most Wanted albums